"Évidemment" is a song by Canadian singer La Zarra, released on 19 February 2023. The song is set to represent France in the Eurovision Song Contest 2023 after La Zarra was internally selected by France Télévisions, the French broadcaster for the Eurovision Song Contest.

Eurovision Song Contest

Internal selection 
On 13 January 2023, France Télévisions officially announced that the broadcaster had internally selected La Zarra to represent France in the Eurovision Song Contest 2023, with the song officially released on 19 February 2023. According to La Zarra, the song she had created was made specifically for the Eurovision Song Contest.

On 16 February, La Zarra officially announced that the title of her song for the contest was "Évidemment".

At Eurovision 
According to Eurovision rules, all nations with the exceptions of the host country and the "Big Five" (France, Germany, Italy, Spain and the United Kingdom) are required to qualify from one of two semi-finals in order to compete in the final; the top ten countries from each semi-final progress to the final. As a member of the "Big Five", France automatically qualified to compete in the final on 13 May 2023. In addition to its participation in the final, France was also required to broadcast and vote in one of the two semi-finals. This was decided via a draw held during the semi-final allocation draw on 31 January 2023, when it was announced that France would be voting in the first semi-final.

References 

2023 songs
2023 singles
Eurovision songs of 2023
Eurovision songs of France